Hijikata (written: 土方) is a Japanese surname, and may refer to:

 Hisaakira Hijikata (1870–1942), Japanese businessman
 Kensuke Hijikata (born 1922), Japanese photographer
 Rinky Hijikata (born 2001), Australian tennis player
 Ryuji Hijikata (born 1978), Japanese professional wrestler
 Tatsumi Hijikata (1928–1986), Japanese choreographer
 Yoshi Hijikata (1898–1959), Japanese theatre director
 Hijikata Hisamoto (1833–1918), Japanese politician
 Hijikata Katsunaga (1851–1884), Japanese daimyō of the late Edo period
 Hijikata Toshizō (1835–1869), deputy leader of the Shinsengumi

Japanese-language surnames